Verrucaria funckii is a species of saxicolous (rock-dwelling), semi-aquatic, crustose lichen in the family Verrucariaceae. It occurs on inundated or submerged rocks (typically siliceous rocks) and pebbles in streams and lakeshores. It is widespread in Europe, including Northern Europe and Iceland, central Europe including the Carpathians and the Alps, and southern Europe. It is also found in Asia and North America.

The lichen was first formally described in 1826 by Kurt Polycarp Joachim Sprengel, as a species of Pyrenula. The species epithet honours German botanist Heinrich Christian Funck, who published the taxon in his series Kryptogamische Gewächse des Fichtelgebirges ("Cryptogamous plants of the Fichtel Mountains"). Alexander Zahlbruckner transferred the taxon to the genus Verrucaria in 1922.

See also
List of Verrucaria species

References

funckii
Lichens described in 1826
Lichen species
Lichens of Asia
Lichens of North America
Lichens of Southeastern Europe
Lichens of Southwestern Europe
Lichens of Northern Europe
Lichens of Central Europe
Lichens of Iceland
Taxa named by Kurt Polycarp Joachim Sprengel